Senanga Airport  is a public airport serving the Zambezi River town of Senanga, Western Province, Zambia.

The airport is in the southwest section of the town. West approach and departure cross the river.

See also

Transport in Zambia
List of airports in Zambia

References

External links
OpenStreetMap - Senanga
SkyVector - Senanga Airport
FallingRain - Senanga

 Google Earth

Airports in Zambia
Buildings and structures in Western Province, Zambia